Joan Leslie (born Joan Agnes Theresa Sadie Brodel; January 26, 1925 – October 12, 2015) was an American actress and vaudevillian, who during the Hollywood Golden Age, appeared in such films as High Sierra (1941), Sergeant York (1941), and Yankee Doodle Dandy (1942).

Early life
Joan Agnes Theresa Sadie Brodel was born on January 26, 1925, in Highland Park, Michigan, the youngest child of John and Agnes Brodel. John was a bank clerk and Agnes was a pianist.

Joan's two older sisters, Betty (born 1919) and Mary Brodel (1916–2015), shared their mother's musical interest and started to learn how to play instruments, such as the saxophone and the banjo, at an early age. They began performing in front of audiences in acts that included singing and dancing. Leslie joined the duo at two and a half years of age. She was soon able to play the accordion.

With her father losing his job in the mid-1930s, the Great Depression caused financial difficulties for the family. As a result, the three sisters entered show business as vaudeville performers to support the family. They began touring in Canada and the United States. Collectively, they were known as The Three Brodels. As an attempt to bypass child labor laws at the time, both Mary and Joan pretended to be older than they were. When Leslie was nine, she told child labor investigators that she was 16 years old. Joan proved to be the scene stealer of the three sisters because of her impersonations of figures such as Katharine Hepburn, Maurice Chevalier, and Jimmy Durante. Coming from a family of Irish ancestry, Leslie was raised as a Roman Catholic and attended Catholic schools in Detroit, Toronto, and Montreal.

Early Hollywood career
In 1936, 11-year-old Leslie caught the attention of a talent scout from Metro-Goldwyn-Mayer (MGM) when the three Brodel sisters were performing in New York. She was given a six-month contract with the studio, earning $200 per week. While working at the studio, she attended MGM's Little Red Schoolhouse with other child actors such as Judy Garland, Mickey Rooney, and Freddie Bartholomew.

Her first film role was in Camille (1936), a romantic drama starring Greta Garbo and Robert Taylor. She played Taylor's younger sister Marie Jeanette, but her speaking scenes were deleted and she was uncredited. MGM had trouble finding suitable roles for her, and she was let go by the studio along with Deanna Durbin. Leslie returned to New York, working on the radio and as a model. During this time, her older sister Mary was signed to Universal Studios. Leslie returned to Hollywood with the rest of her family, working for different studios as a freelancer. She mainly worked for RKO Pictures.

Leslie was selected to play a small role in Men with Wings (1938). While shooting the film, director William A. Wellman discovered that Leslie's mother had lied about her daughter's age and that she was only 13 years old. For the remainder of the filming schedule, Wellman replaced her with Mary.

Leslie gained her first credited role in Winter Carnival (1939) as Betsy Phillips. She was chosen for the part because the director was searching for an actress with a southern accent. She was billed as Joan Brodel. Later that year, she co-starred with Jimmy Lydon in Two Thoroughbreds, in which she played the daughter of a horse owner.

At age 15, Leslie was selected by a group of Hollywood directors as one of 13 "baby stars of 1940." That same year, she appeared in the Warner Bros. film short, Alice in Movieland, about a starlet trying to make her mark in Hollywood. One of the first films directed by Jean Negulesco in Hollywood, it was based on a story by Ed Sullivan.

Success at Warner Bros.

Her big break came when she signed a contract with Warner Bros. in 1941. At the time, actress Joan Blondell's name was considered too similar, so Brodel's acting name was changed to Joan Leslie.

Two weeks later, the then-15-year-old actress was asked to do a screen test while unaware which movie it was for. She got the part because she could cry on cue. The movie was High Sierra (1941), starring Ida Lupino and Humphrey Bogart. Leslie played the crippled girl, Velma. Film critic Bosley Crowther wrote: "a newcomer named Joan Leslie handles lesser roles effectively."

Later that year, Warner Bros. produced a biopic of Alvin C. York, a decorated American World War I soldier, Sergeant York (also 1941), starring Gary Cooper. Jane Russell was initially suggested for the role of Gracie Williams, York's fiancée, but York wanted an actress who neither smoked nor drank. 16-year old Leslie eventually got the part. Sergeant York was a critical and financial success, becoming the highest-grossing movie of 1941. It received 11 Oscar nominations and Cooper won the Best Actor award.

Cooper (aged 40) was 24 years her senior. "Gary gave me a doll on the set," Leslie later told the Toronto Star. "That's how he saw me."

Leslie had a supporting role in The Male Animal (1942). She played Olivia de Havilland's younger sister, Patricia Stanley, a role Gene Tierney had played in the original Broadway production.

She auditioned for Paramount's Holiday Inn (1942), but Warner Bros. decided to cast her in Yankee Doodle Dandy (also 1942) with James Cagney. The film is a musical depicting the life of Broadway entertainer George M. Cohan. Leslie portrayed his girlfriend/wife Mary, an aspiring singer. The film received eight Oscar nominations, including a Best Actor award for James Cagney. By now, Leslie had become a star whose on-screen image was described as "sweet innocence without seeming too sugary."

Leslie was in four motion pictures released during 1943. The first was The Hard Way, starring Ida Lupino and Dennis Morgan. A New York Times reviewer described Leslie as "just as deft and versatile a lady as the character she is supposed to be." For the second, she was lent to RKO for The Sky's the Limit, starring with Fred Astaire. Leslie's character introduced the Harold Arlen-Johnny Mercer song "My Shining Hour". In the third movie, Leslie co-starred in the wartime motion picture This Is the Army  with Ronald Reagan. The fourth movie was Thank Your Lucky Stars.

She was considered for the role of Tessa in The Constant Nymph (also 1943), wherein she would play opposite Errol Flynn. Studio executive Jack L. Warner, though, felt she was unsuitable and the part went to Joan Fontaine. The Australian-born actor Flynn was rejected because the director wanted a British actor.

During World War II, she was a regular volunteer at the Hollywood Canteen, where she danced with servicemen and signed hundreds of autographs. She was featured with Robert Hutton, among many others, in the Warner Bros. film Hollywood Canteen (1944). Like most of the other Hollywood stars appearing in the film, she played herself, but the fictionalized plot had her falling in love with a soldier (played by Hutton) frequenting the canteen. Her sister, actress Betty Brodel, briefly played herself in the film as well. In 1946, an exhibitors' poll conducted by Motion Picture Herald voted Leslie the most promising star of tomorrow.

Later career
By 1946, Leslie was growing increasingly dissatisfied with the roles offered to her by the studio. She sought more serious and mature roles, and wanted to break out of her ingenue image, which was partly due to her young age. Her decision was also based on moral and religious grounds. With the help of her lawyer Oscar Cummings, she took Warner Bros. to court to get released from her contract.

In 1947, the Catholic Theater Guild gave Leslie an award because of her "consistent refusal to use her talents and art in film productions of objectionable character."

As a result of this, Jack Warner used his influence to blacklist her from other major Hollywood studios. In 1947, she signed a two-picture contract with the poverty row studio Eagle-Lion Films. The first one was Repeat Performance (1947), a film noir in which she played a Broadway actress. The other was Northwest Stampede (1948) in which she performed with James Craig.

After her contract with Eagle-Lion Films expired, she was cast in The Skipper Surprised His Wife (1950), appearing with Robert Walker. The film was distributed by MGM, the studio with which she began her film career in 1936.

In the early 1950s, Leslie chose to focus on raising her daughters, which resulted in a more irregular film career. In 1952, she signed a short-term deal with Republic Pictures, the low-budget studio that primarily produced Westerns. One of the films she made for Republic was Flight Nurse (1953). Leslie's character, Polly Davis, was based on the successful flight nurse Lillian Kinkella Keil's career in the Air Force. It was described by the newspaper Kingsport Times-News as a thrilling film that "honors the courageous women who performed miracles of mercy above the clouds in evacuation of wounded GIs from Korean battlefields." Her last film was The Revolt of Mamie Stover (1956), but she continued making sporadic appearances in television shows while her children were at school. She retired from acting in 1991, after appearing in the TV film Fire in the Dark.

Personal life
In March 1950, she married William Caldwell, an obstetrician. Their identical twin daughters, Patrice and Ellen, were born on January 7, 1951. Both daughters eventually became teachers.

Leslie was a Democrat who supported the campaign of Adlai Stevenson during the 1952 presidential election.

Leslie was in the business of designing clothes, with her own eponymous brand. William died in 2000. A year later, she founded the Dr. William G. and Joan L. Caldwell Chair in Gynecologic Oncology for the University of Louisville. Leslie was an adopted alumna of the university for over 32 years.
A devout Catholic, she was involved with charity work for the St. Anne's Maternity Home for more than 50 years.

Death
Leslie died on October 12, 2015, in Los Angeles, California. She was 90.

Awards and honors
On October 8, 1960, Joan Leslie received a star on the Hollywood Walk of Fame at 1560 Vine Street.
In 1999, she was one of the 250 actresses nominated for the American Film Institute's selection of the 25 greatest female screen legends to have debuted before 1950. 
On August 12, 2006, she received a Golden Boot Award for her contributions to Western television shows and movies.

Complete filmography
For TV movies, see the following section.

Television

Radio appearances

References

External links

 
 
 
 Joan Leslie at the American Film Institute

1925 births
2015 deaths
20th-century American actresses
Actresses from Detroit
American Roman Catholics
American child actresses
American film actresses
American television actresses
Articles containing video clips
Burials at Holy Cross Cemetery, Culver City
California Democrats
Metro-Goldwyn-Mayer contract players
Michigan Democrats
Vaudeville performers
Warner Bros. contract players
21st-century American women